The Egyptian hieroglyph  representing gold (𓋞 Gardiner S12), phonetic value nb, is important due to its use in the Horus-of-Gold name, one of the   Fivefold Titulary names of the Egyptian pharaoh.

In its determinative usage, it identifies any precious metal,
 and as an ideogram in "gold" specifically (Egyptian nbw, whence Coptic  nūb). 

The hieroglyph represents a large gold and pearl necklace. Old Kingdom scenes show dwarfs metalworking the gold, and "stringing the pearls of gold".

Derived forms

Three variants of the gold hieroglyph are ligatured with another hieroglyph:

S14-(silver) Gold and mace (club) for "silver."

S13  Egyptian language nbi, for "gild", or "gilt." (Gold and Foot).

S14A Gold and was scepter-("uas scepter"), for "electrum", dj'm.

Usage

Horus-of-Gold name

One of the older uses of the gold hieroglyph is for the Horus-of-Gold, G8 name. Also known as the Golden Horus Name, this form of the pharaoh's name typically featured the image of a Horus falcon perched above /or beside the hieroglyph for gold. 

The meaning of this particular title has been disputed. One belief is that it represents the triumph of Horus over his uncle Seth, as the symbol for gold can be taken to mean that Horus was "superior to his foes". Gold also was strongly associated in the ancient Egyptian mind with eternity, so this may have been intended to convey the pharaoh's eternal Horus name.

Similar to the Fivefold Titulary Nebty name, this particular name typically was not framed by a cartouche or serekh. It always begins with the depiction of the horus falcon perched above a representation of the sun-(hieroglyph).N5

The combination of the Horus falcon and the gold hieroglyph is frequently found on Ancient Egyptian pectorals (see image).

Gold

In the Old Egyptian Palermo Stone inscription (late 24th or early 23rd century BC), 
the hieroglyph is used in the phrases "first counting of gold" and "collar of gold".

<div>One spelling of the word "gold", nbw, in the Egyptian language, uses the melted nugget determinative, N33B (a small circle), and the plural strokes (3-strokes).

Late Period coinage

One of the few coins minted for ancient Egypt is the gold stater, issued during the 30th Dynasty. The reverse of the gold stater shows a horse reared up on its hind legs. The obverse has the two hieroglyphs for nfr and nb: "Perfect gold", or a common-era term:  'Fine'-gold.

See also

Gardiner's Sign List#S. Crowns, Dress, Staves, etc
List of Egyptian hieroglyphs
Nebu

References

Betrò, Maria Carmela.  Hieroglyphics: The Writings of Ancient Egypt, c. 1995, 1996-(English), Abbeville Press Publishers, New York, London, Paris (hardcover)
Budge, The Rosetta Stone, E.A.Wallace Budge, (Dover Publications), c 1929, Dover edition(unabridged), 1989. (softcover)
Schumann-Antelme, and Rossini, 1998. Illustrated Hieroglyphics Handbook, Ruth Schumann-Antelme, and Stéphane Rossini. c 1998, English trans. 2002, Sterling Publishing Co. (Index, Summary lists (tables), selected uniliterals, biliterals, and triliterals.) (softcover)

Gold
Egyptian hieroglyphs: crowns-dress-staves